Ohio v. Clark, 576 U.S. 237 (2015), is United States Supreme Court case opinion that narrowed the standard set in Crawford v. Washington for determining whether hearsay statements in criminal cases are permitted under the Confrontation Clause of the Sixth Amendment. The United States Supreme Court unanimously reversed the Supreme Court of Ohio on June 18, 2015. The Court held that the out-of-court statements were admissible because the primary purpose was not to create evidence. Citing a prior related case, Michigan v. Bryant, the Court formulated this test as one asking "whether a statement was given with the 'primary purpose of creating an out-of-court substitute for trial testimony.'"

See also 
 List of United States Supreme Court cases
 List of United States Supreme Court cases, volume 576
 Lists of United States Supreme Court cases by volume
 List of United States Supreme Court cases by the Roberts Court

External links
 

United States Supreme Court cases
Confrontation Clause case law
2015 in United States case law
United States Supreme Court cases of the Roberts Court